James A. Thompson (c. 1873 – December 4, 1923) was an American politician from New York.

Career

Thompson was a member of the New York State Assembly (Kings Co., 8th D.) in 1905 and 1906. He was a member of the New York State Senate (5th D.) in 1907 and 1908.

Death
He died on December 4, 1923, at his home in Long Beach. An investigation concluded that he was accidentally killed by inhaling gas while sleeping, after a pot of coffee boiled over, extinguishing the flame in a burner. He was buried at the Green-Wood Cemetery in Brooklyn.

Sources
 Official New York from Cleveland to Hughes by Charles Elliott Fitch (Hurd Publishing Co., New York and Buffalo, 1911, Vol. IV; pg. 350, 352 and 366)
 EX-STATE SENATOR IS KILLED BY GAS in NYT on December 5, 1923 (subscription required)

External links
 

1870s births
1923 deaths
Democratic Party New York (state) state senators
People from Brooklyn
Democratic Party members of the New York State Assembly
Burials at Green-Wood Cemetery